The Women's EuroHockey Championship II, formerly known as the Women's EuroHockey Nations Trophy, is a competition for European national field hockey teams. It is the second level of European field hockey Championships for national teams.

Underneath the Championship II there exists at least one division of the EuroHockey Nations Challenge, like European Championship III. There is promotion and relegation. The two first ranked teams qualify for the next EuroHockey Nations Championship and are replaced by the two lowest-ranked teams from that tournament. The teams finishing in seventh and eighth positions are relegated to the Women's EuroHockey Championship III and replaced by the two highest-ranked from that tournament.

The tournament has been won by six different teams: Scotland has the most titles with three followed by Belarus with two and Azerbaijan, Belgium, Ireland and Italy have all won the tournament once. The most recent edition was held in Prague, Czech Republic and was won by Belarus.

Results

Summary

* = host nation

Team appearances

See also
Men's EuroHockey Championship II
Women's EuroHockey Championship III
Women's EuroHockey Indoor Championship II
Women's EuroHockey Nations Championship

References

External links
European Hockey Federation

 
Women's international field hockey competitions in Europe
Recurring sporting events established in 2005